The Parnelli VPJ1 is an open-wheel race car, designed by British designer and engineer Maurice Phillippe for Vel's Parnelli Jones Racing, to compete in U.S.A.C. Championship Car, between 1972. It was driven by Mario Andretti and Al Unser. It didn't win any races, but did score three podium finishes; two for Unser at Indianapolis and Pocono, and one for Andretti at Phoenix.

References

American Championship racing cars
Open wheel racing cars